Moving Wallpaper is a British satirical comedy-drama television series set in a TV production unit. It ran on ITV for two series in 2008–09. The subject of the first series was the production of a soap called Echo Beach, each episode of which aired directly after the Moving Wallpaper episode about its production. The second series shifted to the production of a "zombie show" called Renaissance. Ben Miller confirmed in May 2009 on his Twitter account that no further series would be made.

The title, Moving Wallpaper, is a disparaging term applied to uninspiring television series, or to television in general, referring to the perception that modern television viewers are "mindless absorbers of images", as if staring at wallpaper.

Production 
The show was created by Tony Jordan and produced by Kudos for ITV. Filming for series one started in July 2007 and the show began airing on ITV on 10 January 2008, continuing at 9 pm on Fridays thereafter for twelve weekly episodes. The "fictional" soap opera Echo Beach was itself shown immediately afterwards at 9.30 pm.
In Australia, series one of Moving Wallpaper aired back-to-back with Echo Beach on ABC2 each Friday at 8:30pm from 30 May 2008. Both programmes were later repeated on the higher-rated ABC1 channel a year later from 6 May 2009 on Wednesday nights. Yet, this time, Echo Beach was separated from its sister program and placed in an early Saturday evening timeslot three days later. Series two premiered on ABC1 each Friday night at 10:15pm from 19 February 2010.

A six-episode second series of Moving Wallpaper was commissioned and began airing on ITV on 28 February 2009, again in the Friday 9 pm slot. The companion soap Echo Beach was cancelled, however, and the storylines of series two instead revolved around a "zombie show" called Renaissance. Unlike Echo Beach in series one, which was a full broadcast series, Renaissance was a half-hour pilot. A shortened version of this episode, with a running time of nine minutes, was screened after the conclusion of the second series only on the ITV website, ITV Player.

Premise
Moving Wallpaper storylines revolve around a crazed producer, Jonathan Pope (played by Ben Miller), trying to hold together an assortment of egotistic and neurotic writers and actors through the vicissitudes of Echo Beach production (series one), while simultaneously fighting off his bitchy boss.

Series one ended with the producer on the verge of learning whether a second series of Echo Beach had been commissioned. Series two picked up from this point with the news that the network had cancelled Echo Beach (mirroring the real-life circumstance). However, a clause in Pope's contract compels the network to allow him to make a pilot for a new show, which largely by accident turns out to be the "zombie show" Renaissance. After rejection by the network, Pope forces a website editor to upload the pilot to the itv.com website (again linking to the real-life circumstance).

Cast and characters

Main cast and characters 
 Ben Miller as Jonathan Pope, an Executive Producer.
 Lucy Liemann as Samantha Phillips, a script editor.
 Sarah Hadland as Gillian McGovern, a script writer.
 James Lance as Tom Warren, a script writer.
 Dave Lamb as Carl Morris, a script writer.
 Sinead Keenan as Kelly Hawkins, a PA.
 Elizabeth Berrington as Mel Debrou, a cast liaison. 
 Raquel Cassidy as Nancy Weeks, an executive in charge of continuing drama.

Echo Beach actors 
 Jason Donovan appears as himself (series 1).
 Martine McCutcheon appears as herself (series 1).
 Hugo Speer appears as himself (series 1).
 Susie Amy appears as herself (series 1).

Renaissance actors 
 Alan Dale appears as himself playing Renaissance character John Priest (series 2 and Renaissance). 
 Kelly Brook appears as herself playing Renaissance character Samantha Hall (series 2 and Renaissance).

Episodes

Series 1 
The first series of Moving Wallpaper was broadcast alongside Echo Beach. Moving Wallpaper characters Tom Warren, Carl Morris, and Gillian McGovern are credited on-screen as writers during early Echo Beach episodes, while Jonathan Pope is credited as a producer during the opening titles of Echo Beach entire first series. Prior to Echo Beach star Susie Amy's promotion to series regular, Jonathan Pope comments that he will "bump" the writers credit in all future episodes in order to facilitate this. 
{| class="wikitable plainrowheaders" style="width: 100%; margin-right: 0;"
|-style="color:white;"
! style="background:#005757;"| Episode No.
! style="background:#005757;"| No. in Series
! style="background:#005757;"| Title
! style="background:#005757;"| Directed by
! style="background:#005757;"| Written by
! style="background:#005757;"| Original air date
! style="background:#005757;"| Viewers(million)
{{Episode list 
 |EpisodeNumber=1
 |EpisodeNumber2=1
 |Title=Echo Beach Part I
 |WrittenBy= Tony Jordan
 |DirectedBy= Dominic Brigstocke
 |OriginalAirDate=
 |Viewers= 5.00
 |ShortSummary=Jonathan Pope wants a show with intrigue and passion; Nancy wants to see the back of him; and the writers just want an end to all the changes. Will the team pull together all the new characters and stories in time for the launch of Echo Beach? Later, Jason Donovan insists on being signed as a series regular, and Jonathan decides to create a character who looks "a bit like Tiffany from EastEnders". 
 |LineColor=005757
}}

|}

 Echo Beach Echo Beach was broadcast immediately following Moving Wallpaper first series. The series consists of twelve thirty-minute episodes.

 Series 2 
The second series of Moving Wallpaper focused on the production of Renaissance, an online drama starring Alan Dale as John Priest, named for Jonathan Pope, and Kelly Brook as Samantha, named for the fictional script editor of the same name.

RenaissanceRenaissance was broadcast as a nine-minute pilot on ITV Player following the final episode of Moving Wallpaper.

 Reception 
Media reviews for Moving Wallpaper were largely positive (though the series one companion show Echo Beach was received less favourably). The Telegraphs reviewer described Moving Wallpaper as "sharply written and cleverly characterised", and a review in The Times called it "joyously and uproariously funny". The Mirror was less enthusiastic, however, saying "Moving Wallpaper remains a laboured in-joke at its own expense", and celebrity website Hecklerspray agreed describing it as being "merely millimetres away from being the epitome of mediocre, easy watch television."

The episode of Moving Wallpaper broadcast on 20 March 2009, in which a transsexual script writer was made the butt of a series of jokes, was described by groups representing transgender people as transphobic and likely to encourage hate-crime and discrimination against transgender people. Ofcom, the UK broadcast media watchdog, received 100 complaints over the episode and launched an investigation to see if any broadcasting codes were breached. ITV and the programme were cleared by Ofcom in June 2009.

DVD release
The complete first series was released on Region 2 DVD on 24 March 2008, combined with the Echo Beach'' series. It was also released separately.

References

External links
 
 
 

2008 British television series debuts
2009 British television series endings
British comedy-drama television shows
English-language television shows
ITV (TV network) original programming
Television series about television